= Omar Murad =

Palestinian politician

In-charge of the Syria Branch of the Popular Front for the Liberation of Palestine (PFLP)

Personal details
- Party: Popular Front for the Liberation of Palestine (PFLP)
- Occupation: Politician

Omar Murad (Arabic: عمر مراد, kunya 'Abu al-Majed') is a Palestinian politician. As of 2015, he was in-charge of the Syria Branch of the Popular Front for the Liberation of Palestine (PFLP).
